Florea Dumitrescu (April 4, 1927 – April 16, 2018) was a Romanian economist and diplomat. Dumitrescu held the positions of Minister of Finance of Romania from 1969 to 1978 and Governor of the National Bank of Romania from 1984 until 1989 under President Nicolae Ceaușescu during the country's Communist era. He served as Ambassador of Romania to China from 1978 to 1983.

In parallel, he also served as Ambassador of Romania to Myanmar from 1979 to 1987.

Dumitrescu, the son of farmers, wanted to become an economist and financier to escape the rural poverty in which he was raised. He graduated from the Bucharest Academy of Economic Studies in 1949.

He was appointed Governor of the National Bank of Romania from 1984 until his dismissal by Ceaușescu in March 1989.

Dumitrescu died at his home in Bucharest on April 16, 2018, at the age of 91.

References

1927 births
2018 deaths
Governors of the National Bank of Romania
Romanian Ministers of Finance
Ambassadors of Romania to China
Ambassadors of Romania to Myanmar
20th-century Romanian economists
Bucharest Academy of Economic Studies alumni
Romanian Communist Party politicians
People from Teleorman County